Simpich may refer to:

Alice Louise Judd Simpich (1918–2006), American sculptor
 Frederick Simpich (1878–1950), American writer
Simpich Character Dolls, an American doll-making company